Kamarupa was a powerful and formidable kingdom in Northeast India ruled by three dynasties (Varmans, Mlechchha and Palas) from their capitals in Pragjyotishpura, Haruppeshwara and Durjaya.

Early development
Xuanzang's account from the seventh century states the people of Kamarupa worshiped the devas and did not believe in Buddhism. There were a few Buddhists who performed devotional rites in secret for fear of persecution. Shilabhadra is said to have stated that Buddhism had spread there.

Bhaskaravarman, with tutelary deity Shiva, is said to have treated the accomplished shramanas with respect. 

 

Whatever that may be, although Brahmanic rites were widely prevalent amongst the populace, there is no doubt that Buddhism also flourished, for it is mentioned in the "Sankara Digvijaya" that Sankaracharya, the famous leader of the Brahmanic revival, at the beginning of the ninth century A.D., came to Kumarupa in order to defeat Abhinava Gupta, the noted Buddhist scholar, in controversy. About the same time, or a little earlier, Kumarila Bhatta, another Brahmanic leader, flourished in India. It is believed by some that he was a native of Kamarupa. 

Giuseppe Tucci states, on the authority of two Tibetan works viz "Grub To'b" and the "Bka ababs bdun ldan" that the noted Buddhist Siddha Minanatha, who was looked upon in Tibet as an avatar of Avalokiteswara, was a fisherman from Kamarupa. The statement of Mahamohopadhya Pandit Haraprasad Sastri that Minanatha was a native of Bengal belonging to the "Nath" or weaver caste is evidently incorrect. Minanatha is supposed to have been the author of a work known as Akulaviratantra and he is mentioned in the Sabaratantra as one of the twenty four Kapalika Siddhas.

It has been pointed out that Visakha Datta, the author of the well-known drama Mudrarakshasam, who flourished towards the latter part of the seventh century, probably belonged to that part of Kamarupa which lay between the Teesta and the Kausika. It find the mention of a Kamrupi pandit, named Vishnusomacharya, to whom Anantavarman granted lands. This Brahman belonged to the Parasara gotra, and his native village was Srangatika in Kamarupa.

Standard of architecture

The shrine of Pandu contains five rock-cut figures, four of which represent Ganesa, and one represents a female deity, probably Durga. Two more figures cut in the open rock below, facing the Brahmaputra River, represent, according to Mr. Dikshit, the sun-god and Indra respectively. Numerous cuttings on the rock are to be also seen on the western slope of the Kamakhya hill. 

Mr. R. D. Banerji thinks that these carvings belong to the seventh or the eighth century A.D. The ruins existing in or near Tezpur are much more extensive and varied in character. Dr. Bloch conjectured that the modem civil stations of Guwahati and Tezpur stood upon large mounds " which contain the remains of two ancient cities." In 1906, while foundations were being dug for additions to the Deputy Commissioner's office in Tezpur, the excavators came upon the remains of an ancient stone building. A large number of carved and sculptured stones were discovered. The majority of them were transferred to the compounds of the European officers and the tea-planters club for the purpose of decoration. Some of them were subsequently brought to Cole Park and arranged there. 

There are two specimens in the public park at Tezpur which appear to belong to another temple of some later date. One of these is a high doorjamb, and the second a slab bearing three sunken panels occupied by very crude human or divine figures. The entire collection contains only a single specimen carved in the round, a lion, presumably on an elephant. The conventional representation of the lion shows that the inhabitants of the Assam valley were not very familiar with the king of beasts. As remarked by Mr. Banerji, "Assam is the only province of India the history of the architecture and sculpture of which is still practically unknown".

It is for this reason that it have made a lengthy quotation front the report of a competent authority on the subject. It is, however, in doubt whether Mr. Banerji's conjecture that the ruins in Tezpur town represent only temples is correct. The remains of the stone building dug up in the Kutchery compound may be of the palace of Vanamala, which he erected in the ninth century. However, it cannot agree with Mr. Banerji that any of the buildings mentioned by him was erected in the twelfth century for, towards the end of the tenth century, the capital Haruppeswara was, in all probability, abandoned by Brahma Pala. The buildings in Tezpur must therefore belong to the ninth century. Further, the lofty temple, the ruins of which he has described in the quotation given above and which, he conjectures was a sun temple, maybe the Himalaya like temple of Hataka Sulin which Vanamala is said to have recreated. In his report for the year 1925-26. Mr. Banerji gives a full description of the Bamuni Hill ruins to the east of Tezpur town. 

Relics of ancient architecture and sculpture are not confined to Guwahati and Tezpur. They are to be found in many other places. Two images were discovered on the Golaghat-Dimapur road. One of them is an image of Vishnu which is now preserved in the museum of the Kamaruppa Anusandhan Samiti. With regard to this image Mr. K. N. Dikshit writes:

The image exhibits the Dhyana mudra and is surrounded by ararana devatas such as Durga, Ganesa and Kartikeya with the winged Garuda: below it. With regard to this image Mr. K.N. Dikshit writes that

There is a collection of stone images and other architectural fragments preserved at the entrance of the Sub-divisional officer's residence in Sibsagar. These are believed to be the remains of a Vishnu temple, in the neighbourhood, dating approximately from the tenth to the eleventh century A. D. According to Mr. Dikshit  The ancient temple near Sibsagar was most likely constructed by the Kamarupa kings of the tenth or the eleventh century, therefore it is evident that even until the eleventh century the Kamarupa kings exercised their rule as far as the easternmost corner of the Assam valley. Mr. Dikshit also remarks that "the affinities of Assamese art would seem to lie more with the schools of Bihar and Orissa than with the contemporary Pala art of Bengal. This is not unnatural as of the streams of influence that have molded the culture of Assam, the strongest current has always been from North Bihar and Mid-India". The cultural affinities between Mithila and Kamarupa have already been alluded.

Another instance of the architectural and engineering skill of the people of Kamarupa in ancient times was the construction of stone bridges over rivers. There is still a small stone bridge in the western part of North Guwahati which is called Silsako. The other Silsako (stone bridge) was over a channel of the Barnadi, an important transit point from west. Bridge was destroyed by the great earthquake of 1897. It appears that this bridge was constructed without lime and mortar and such construction was no doubt necessitated by the heavy rainfall in the country and the luxuriant vegetation which attacks all masonry structures in which mortar is used. Hannay, who in 1851 saw and measured the bridge, gave a description.

See also
 Kamrup
 Kamrupi

References

Further reading

 
 
 
 
 
 
 
 
 
 
 

Kamrupi culture
Kamarupa (former kingdom)
Cultural history of Assam